Beatrix "Trixi" Schuba (born 15 April 1951) is an Austrian former competitive figure skater who competed in ladies' singles. She is a six-time Austrian national champion (1967–1972), a two-time European champion (1971 and 1972), a two-time World champion (1971 and 1972), and 1972 Olympic champion.

She is considered to be one of the best compulsory figure skaters ever.

Early life 
Schuba was born in Vienna. After her father died when she was thirteen, she went to trade school and eventually took over the bookkeeping of her family's lumber business in Vienna; mornings were given to skating and afternoons to work.

Competitive career
Schuba's interest in figure skating began as a young child in 1955 when she happened to see an American competition on the television bought by her parents to watch performances of the Vienna State Opera and the Burgtheater. She was coached by Helmut Seibt from 1955 to 1962, and then by Leopold Linhart.

Her first major success was winning the ladies' singles portion of the Austrian Championships at the age of sixteen in 1967; she would go on to defend her title five straight times. Schuba steadily improved throughout the end of the 1960s and the early 1970s, placing in the top five several times and eventually taking first twice each at the European Championships and the World Championships in 1971 and 1972.

Schuba's greatest success came in 1972 at the Winter Olympics at Sapporo when she won the gold medal. She is the first Austrian lady since Herma Szabo in 1924 to win gold and is the most recent. Schuba, the dominant compulsory figures skater, placed first in the figures and Janet Lynn of the United States, the top free skater, placed first after the free skate. As the scoring system used at the time placed more weight on figures, Schuba won the gold medal and Lynn won the bronze behind silver medalist Karen Magnussen of Canada.

The International Skating Union, the governing body of the sport, would over the ensuing years decrease the weight given the figures portion before finally eliminating it in 1990.

After winning gold at Sapporo, Schuba did the same the next month at the World Championships, successfully defending against silver medalist Magnussen and bronze medalist Lynn. At the end of the year, sportswriters named her Athlete of the Year for 1972.

Later career 
Retiring from amateur skating, Schuba appeared over the succeeding six years in the professional shows Ice Follies and Holiday on Ice, after which she began a career in the insurance industry which she continues to the present.

In addition to her career in insurance, Schuba is involved in various sports organizations in Austria.  She is a former president of the Austrian Ice Skating Association, the first woman to hold that position, and she sat on the board of the Austrian Olympic Committee from 2004 to 2009. Schuba has served as president of the International Panathlon Club Wien since 2007, on the board of the Austrian Paralympic Committee since 2009, and as vice president of the Graz Skating Association since 2010.

Results

References

External links

 

1951 births
Austrian female single skaters
Olympic figure skaters of Austria
Figure skaters at the 1972 Winter Olympics
Olympic gold medalists for Austria
Figure skaters from Vienna
Living people
Olympic medalists in figure skating
World Figure Skating Championships medalists
European Figure Skating Championships medalists
Medalists at the 1972 Winter Olympics